The Bishop of Willesden is an episcopal title used by a suffragan bishop of the Church of England Diocese of London, in the Province of Canterbury, England. The title takes its name after Willesden, an area of the London Borough of Brent; the See was erected under the Suffragans Nomination Act 1888 by Order in Council dated 8 August 1911.

The post was created in 1911, and was the third suffragan bishopric erected in the diocese since 1879. The new bishop was given oversight of four rural deaneries: Hampstead, Hornsey, St Pancras and Willesden, previously the responsibility of the Bishop of Islington. By November 1911, the Bishop's residence was 13 Cannon Place, Hampstead.

In the experimental area scheme of 1970, the bishop was given oversight of the deaneries of Brent, Harrow, Ealing East and West, and Hillingdon. The bishops suffragan of Willesden have been area bishops since the London area scheme was founded in 1979. The bishop now has responsibility for the Willesden Episcopal Area, that is, the Archdeaconry of Northolt, comprising four deaneries: Brent, Ealing, Harrow and Hillingdon.

List of bishops

References

External links
 Crockford's Clerical Directory - Listings

 
Willesden